The 2008–09 Big 12 Conference men's basketball season marks the 13th season of Big 12 Conference basketball.

Preseason

Big 12 coaches poll

All-Big 12 players
Curtis Jerrells, Baylor
Sherron Collins, Kansas
Blake Griffin, Oklahoma
A. J. Abrams, Texas
Damion James, Texas

Player of the Year 
Blake Griffin, Oklahoma

Newcomer of the Year
Mario Little, Kansas

Freshman of the Year
Willie Warren, Oklahoma

Regular season

Rankings

In-season honors
Players of the week
Throughout the conference regular season, the Big 12 offices name a player of the week each Monday.

Conference honors

** – Unanimous Selection

National awards & honors

Player of the year
Blake Griffin, Oklahoma
Oscar Robertson Trophy
CBSSports.com Player of the Year
Sporting News Player of the Year
Sports Illustrated Player of the Year
Fox Sports Player of the Year
Adolph Rupp Trophy

Coach of the year
Bill Self, Kansas
AP Coach of the Year
USBWA Henry Iba Award
CBSSports.com Coach of the Year
Sporting News Coach of the Year
Fox Sports Coach of the Year
CBS/Chevrolet Coach of the Year

Mike Anderson, Missouri
NABC Co-Coach of the Year

All-District teams

USBWA
USBWA All-District 6
Blake Griffin, Oklahoma
Craig Brackins, Iowa State
Cole Aldrich, Kansas
Sherron Collins, Kansas
Denis Clemente, Kansas State
DeMarre Carroll, Missouri
Leo Lyons, Missouri
Willie Warren, Oklahoma
James Anderson, Oklahoma State

USBWA All-District 7
Curtis Jerrells, Baylor
A.J. Abrams, Texas
Damion James, Texas
Josh Carter, Texas A&M
John Roberson, Texas Tech

NABC
NABC All-District 8
First Team
Craig Brackins, Iowa State
Cole Aldrich, Kansas
Sherron Collins, Kansas
DeMarre Carroll, Missouri
Blake Griffin, Oklahoma

Second Team
Curtis Jerrells, Baylor
Willie Warren, Oklahoma
James Anderson, Oklahoma State
A.J. Abrams, Texas
Damion James, Texas

All-Americans
Blake Griffin, Oklahoma
USBWA, First Team
CBSSports.com, First Team
Sporting News, First Team
Sports Illustrated, First Team
Fox Sports, First Team
Adolph Rupp Award, First Team
Associated Press, First Team

Sherron Collins, Kansas
USBWA, Second Team
CBSSports.com, Second Team
Fox Sports, Second Team
Sporting News, Third Team
Associated Press, Third Team

Craig Brackins, Iowa State
Associated Press, Honorable Mention

Cole Aldrich, Kansas
Associated Press, Honorable Mention

DeMarre Carroll, Missouri
Associated Press, Honorable Mention

Freshman teams
Tyshawn Taylor, Kansas
CBSSports.com, First Team

Willie Warren, Oklahoma
CBSSports.com, First Team
Fox Sports, First Team

NCAA All-Regional teams
South Regional
Blake Griffin, Oklahoma

West Regional
DeMarre Carroll, Missouri
J.T. Tiller, Missouri

Midwest Regional
Cole Aldrich, Kansas

Statistical leaders
Statistics shown cover the entire 2008–09 season.

Individual

Min. 5 FGM/Gm

Min 1.5 3Pt FGM/Gm.

Min 2.5 Per Gm

Team

Postseason

Big Twelve tournament

NCAA tournament

National Invitation Tournament

References